Keilor Park Soccer Club is an Australian soccer club based in Keilor Park, Melbourne. The club currently competes in the Victorian State League Division 1.

History
The Keilor Park Soccer Club was originally established in 1957, at the Blue Cellar Restaurant in Fitzroy from where the club's administration was conducted until 1961. The club originally appointed two club administrators to organise the formation and structure of the club and election of the first Committee. According to club records, the first official game of soccer was played in 1958.
Keilor's first home ground was at Royal Park, behind the current Royal Children's Hospital. The Club then moved on a number of occasions from Royal Park to Elwood, Footscray, Maribyrnong and finally to today's home ground at Keilor Park Reserve. In the mid to late sixties, the first ideas about locating the club to Keilor were formed. It was a hard and painstaking process which brought the club into severe difficulties. The club was allocated some land at Keilor Park Reserve in 1974 and held its first working bee in 1975. The first official training night was held at Keilor Park on 3 February 1976 with the first home game against Doveton on 3 July of the same year. The Club remains based at Keilor Park Recreational Reserve. Keilor Soccer Club amalgamated with Sunshine Park in 1997 to form Keilor Park SC, It has a large backing from the Maltese Australian Community due to its roots.

References

External links
 Keilor Park Soccer Club Official Website
 Official Facebook Page
 Football Federation Victoria
 Ozfootball – Australian Soccer Archives

Soccer clubs in Melbourne
Association football clubs established in 1957
1957 establishments in Australia
Diaspora sports clubs in Australia
Sport in the City of Hume
Women's soccer clubs in Australia
Maltese diaspora